The 137th Guards Airborne Regiment is a formation of the Russian Airborne Troops. It is part of the 106th Guards Tula Airborne Division.

In 2014, the regiment was involved in the Russian military intervention in Ukraine. It fought again in the Russian invasion of Ukraine in 2022. At the Battle of Izium (counteroffensive phrase) the unit fell into an ambush, losing their commander, Lieutenant Colonel Pavel Krivov.

History 
The regiment was formed on 1 October 1948 in Ryazan as the 137th Guards Air-Landing Regiment of the 11th Guards Airborne Division. In 1949 it was converted into an airborne regiment. In May 1955 it became part of the 106th Guards Airborne Division after the 11th Guards Airborne Division was disbanded.

References 

Regiments of the Russian Airborne Troops
Military units and formations established in 1949
Airborne units and formations of the Soviet Union
Military units and formations of Russia in the war in Donbas